Araeomolis transversa is a moth of the family Erebidae. It is found in French Guiana.

References

Moths described in 1993
Phaegopterina
Moths of South America